Radio 1's Live Lounge – Volume 3 is a collection of live tracks played on Jo Whiley's Radio 1 show. The album is the third in a series of Live Lounge albums. It consists of both covers and the bands' own songs. The album was released on 20 October 2008.

Track listing

Disc 1
 Duffy - "Mercy"
 The Ting Tings - "Standing in the Way of Control" (originally by Gossip)
 Dizzee Rascal - "That's Not My Name" (originally by The Ting Tings)
 Sam Sparro - "American Boy" (originally by Estelle)
 Pendulum - "Violet Hill" (originally by Coldplay)
 The Streets - "Blinded by the Lights"
 McFly - "I Kissed a Girl" (originally by Katy Perry)
 The Kooks - "Shine On"
 Newton Faulkner - "Foundations" (originally by Kate Nash)
 Panic! At The Disco - "Nine in the Afternoon"
 Girls Aloud - "With Every Heartbeat" (originally by Robyn and Kleerup)
 The Feeling - "Work" (originally by Kelly Rowland)
 The Hoosiers - "LoveStoned" (originally by Justin Timberlake)
 The Wombats - "Moving to New York"
 Paramore - "Love's Not a Competition (But I'm Winning)" (originally by Kaiser Chiefs)
 Elliot Minor - "Rule the World" (originally by Take That)
 Ida Maria - "Sweet About Me" (originally by Gabriella Cilmi)
 R.E.M. - "Munich" (originally by Editors)
 Glasvegas - "Daddy's Gone"
 Foo Fighters - "Keep the Car Running" (originally by Arcade Fire)

Disc 2
 The Script - "Lose Yourself" (originally by Eminem)
 Adele - "Chasing Pavements"
 Elbow - "One Day Like This"
 Scouting For Girls - "Elvis Ain't Dead"
 Guillemots - "Black and Gold" (originally by Sam Sparro)
 Lupe Fiasco -  "Superstar"
 DJ Ironik - "Stay with Me"
 Kate Nash - "Fluorescent Adolescent" (originally by Arctic Monkeys)
 Goldfrapp - "It's Not Over Yet" (originally by Grace, covered recently by Klaxons)
 The Pigeon Detectives - "Ready for the Floor" (originally by Hot Chip)
 Kasabian - "L.S.F."
 Athlete - "Wires"
 The Zutons - "Beautiful" (originally by Christina Aguilera)
 The Automatic - "Love in This Club" (originally by Usher)
 Santogold - "Hometown Glory" (originally by Adele)
 Alphabeat - "10,000 Nights"
 Bat For Lashes - "Sweet Dreams (Are Made of This)" (originally by Eurythmics)
 Ne-Yo - "Closer"
 Rihanna - "Hate That I Love You"
 Estelle - "American Boy"

See also
Live Lounge
Radio 1's Live Lounge
Radio 1's Live Lounge - Volume 2
Radio 1's Live Lounge – Volume 4
Radio 1's Live Lounge – Volume 5
Radio 1: Established 1967

References

External links
Radio 1's Live Lounge – Volume 3 on Myspace

Live Lounge
2008 compilation albums
Covers albums
2008 live albums